Arizona Storm was a professional indoor soccer team based in Phoenix, Arizona. They played in the Southwestern Division of the Professional Arena Soccer League. Launched in 2011 as the "Phoenix Monsoon" with the Phoenix Sports Centre in Phoenix as their home turf, the team relocated to the Arizona Sports Complex in Glendale for the 2012–13 season. The team folded after the end of that season.

Team roster
As of 12/15/2012

Year-by-year

Arenas
Randall McDaniel Sports Complex, Avondale, Arizona (2011–12)
Phoenix Sports Centre, Phoenix, Arizona (2011–12)
Arizona Sports Complex, Glendale, Arizona (2012–13)

References

2011 establishments in Arizona
Soccer clubs in Arizona
Association football clubs established in 2011
Defunct Professional Arena Soccer League teams
Sports in Phoenix, Arizona